From 1906 to 1926, the Finnish Swimming Federation did not arrange a dedicated national competition, but spread out the hosting duties of the championship events to multiple clubs.

Diving

Men

Plain 
Competed in Turku on 26 July 1908.

Source:

Springboard 
Competed in Helsinki on 8 August 1908.

Source:

Women

Platform 
Competed in Tampere on 16 August 1908.

Source:

Swimming

Men

100 metre freestyle 
Competed in Helsinki on 8 (heats) and 9 (final) August 1908.

Heats 
Three fastest times qualified for the final.

Final 

Source:

1000 metre freestyle 
Competed in Helsinki on 9 August 1908.

Source:

200 metre breaststroke 
Competed in Tampere on 16 August 1908.

Source:

100 metre life saving 
Competed in Vaasa on 1 August 1908.

Source:

4 × 50 metre freestyle relay 
Competed in Vaasa on 1 August 1908.

Source:

Women

100 metre freestyle 
Competed in Turku on 26 July 1908.

Source:

Water polo

Men 
Competed in Helsinki on 9 August 1908. Championship was decided by a single match, won by Helsingfors Simsällskap 7–1 (3–1, 4–0).

Source:

Sources

References 

National swimming competitions
National championships in Finland
Swimming competitions in Finland
1908 in Finnish sport
1908 in water sports
Diving competitions in Finland
Water polo competitions